Interlaken is a rural locality in the local government areas of Northern Midlands, Central Highlands, and Southern Midlands in the Central region of Tasmania. The 2016 census determined a population of 24 for the state suburb of Interlaken.

History
Interlaken was gazetted as a locality in 1973. The name has been in use since 1837. It is believed to be derived from a town in Switzerland with similar alpine lake surroundings.

Geography
Lake Crescent is within the locality, and Lake Sorell forms much of the northern boundary.

Road infrastructure
The C527 route (Interlaken Road) enters from the west and runs through to the south-east before exiting. Route C526 (Tunbridge Tier Road) starts at an intersection with C527 and runs east before exiting. Route C528 (Dennistoun Road) starts at an intersection with C527 and runs south before exiting.

References

Localities of Northern Midlands Council
Localities of Central Highlands Council
Localities of Southern Midlands Council
Towns in Tasmania